Bespokoyny is a decommissioned  of the Russian Navy preserved as museum ship.

Development and design 

The project began in the late 1960s when it was becoming obvious to the Soviet Navy that naval guns still had an important role particularly in support of amphibious landings, but existing gun cruisers and destroyers were showing their age. A new design was started, employing a new 130 mm automatic gun turret.

Construction and career 
Bespokoyny was laid down on 18 April 1987 and launched on 9 June 1990 by Severnaya Verf in Leningrad. She was commissioned on 28 December 1991.

In September 2016, the ship was docked at the Yantar Baltic Shipyard for conversion. The ship's hull was sealed so that it could be afloat without maintenance by a permanent crew. On September 28, the press service of the enterprise reported that the destroyer would stay at the plant for about a month. During this time, the plant's specialists would carry out the full scope of work on its conversion. In particular, the screws and shafts would be removed, and the destroyer's hull preserved and painted. 

On May 13, 2018, Bespokoyny arrived at a permanent anchorage at the base of the Baltic Fleet. It was turned into an exhibit of the military-historical complex of the Western Military District, and for the students of the Saint Petersburg regional branch of the Yunarmiya, the destroyer became a place for educational excursions.

In 2020, it was reported that Bespokoynys two propellers had been stolen and sold for profit by a group that included the ship's former commanding officer.

References 

1990 ships
Ships of the Soviet Union
Ships built at Severnaya Verf
Naval ships of the Soviet Union
Museum ships in Russia
Sovremenny-class destroyers